Marcel Brandt (born 8 May 1992) is a German professional ice hockey player for the Straubing Tigers of the Deutsche Eishockey Liga (DEL) and the German national team.

He represented Germany at the 2021 IIHF World Championship.

References

External links

1992 births
Living people
German ice hockey defencemen
Düsseldorfer EG players
ESV Kaufbeuren players
Rote Teufel Bad Nauheim players
Straubing Tigers players
Ice hockey players at the 2022 Winter Olympics
Olympic ice hockey players of Germany